Johntown may refer to:

Johntown, Georgia
Johntown, Nevada

See also
Johnstown (disambiguation)